The Reluctant Dragon may refer to:

 "The Reluctant Dragon" (short story), an 1898 children's story by Kenneth Grahame
 The Reluctant Dragon (1941 film), a 1941 Disney film based on the story
 The Reluctant Dragon (1987 film), a 1987 British animated film based on the story